Awang may refer to:

Names

Patronym
 Abdul Hadi Awang (born 1947), Malaysian politician
 Azizulhasni Awang (born 1988), Malaysian professional track cyclist
 Hasbullah Awang (1952–2015), Malaysian sports commentator
 Hasbullah Awang (footballer) (born 1983), Malaysian footballer
 Mat Aznan Awang (died 1993), Malaysian Army soldier
 Suffian Awang (born 1971), political secretary for the Prime Minister of Malaysia
 Usman Awang (1929–2001), Malaysian poet, playwright, novelist
 Yahya Awang, Malaysian cardiothoracic surgeon

Given name
 Awang Adek Hussin (born 1956), former Malaysian Ambassador to the United States
 Awang Alak Betatar or Muhammad Shah (1368–1402), first Sultan of Brunei
 Awang anak Rawang (born 1929), an Iban Scout from Sarawak in Borneo
 Awang Faroek Ishak (born 1948), Governor of East Kalimantan
 Awang Pateh Berbai (died 1425), third Sultan of Brunei
 Awang Hassan (1910–1998), Malaysian politician

Places
 Awang Bay, Lombok, Indonesia
 Awang Kasom, a village in Ukhrul district, Manipur state, India

Other
 Awang (boat), an ornate traditional dugout canoe used by the Maranao people of the Philippines
 Awang (honorific), a Bruneian honorific
 Awang Airport, Maguindanao, Philippines